The 2009 Canadian Floorball Championships were the third national championships in Canadian floorball. The tournament took place from April 17 to April 19, 2009 in Richmond, British Columbia. The event was organized by the British Columbia Floorball Federation (BCFF), and is sanctioned by Floorball Canada.

All matches took place in the Richmond Olympic Oval, an official venue for the 2010 Winter Olympics.

In conjunction with the event, 3 friendly matches between the men's national floorball teams of India and Canada were played. In addition to that, there was an International Floorball Federation development seminar as well.

Men's results

Preliminary round

April 17, 2009

Note: All times are PST

April 18, 2009

Note: All times are PST

Playoffs

Semi-finals

Note: All times are PST

Bronze-medal match

Note: All times are PST

Canadian Championship Match

Note: All times are PST

Women's results

Preliminary round

April 17, 2009

Note: All times are PST

April 18, 2009

Note: All times are PST

Playoffs

Semi-finals

Note: All times are PST

Bronze-medal match

Note: All times are PST

Canadian Championship Match

Note: All times are PST

Friendly Internationals

April 17, 2009

Note: All times are PST

April 18, 2009

Note: All times are PST

April 19, 2009

Note: All times are PST

See also
2007 Canadian Floorball Championships

Canadian Floorball Championships, 2009
Floorball competitions
Richmond, British Columbia